Diego Ramírez may refer to:
 Diego Ramírez de Guzmán (bishop of León) (died 1354)
 Diego Ramírez de Guzmán (bishop of Oviedo) (1412–1441)
 Diego Ramírez de Guzmán (died 1508), bishop of Catania
 Diego Ramírez de Arellano (c. 1580–1624), Spanish sailor and cosmographer
 Diego Ramírez (footballer) (born 1981), Mexican football defender
 Diego Ramirez (artist) (born 1989), Australian/Mexican artist

See also
 Diego Ramírez Islands, a small group of islands in Chile, named for the sailor

Ramirez, Diego